Inulanthera is a genus of flowering plants in the daisy family, native to Madagascar and southern Africa.

 Species

References

Asteraceae genera
Anthemideae
Flora of Africa